Otto IV, Count of Ravensberg ( – 1328) was a German nobleman. He was the ruling Count of Ravensberg from 1306 until his death.

Otto was the fifth child of Count Otto III and his wife Hedwig of Lippe ( – 5 March 1315), daughter of Bernard III, Lord of Lippe.

Marriage and descendants 
In 1313, Otto IV married Margaret of Berg-Windeck. Together, they had two daughters:
 Hedwig (d. after 1387) married Duke William II of Brunswick-Lüneburg
 Margaret ( – 19 February 1389) married Gerhard VI of Jülich, Count of Berg and Ravensberg

References 
 

Counts of Ravensberg
1270s births
1328 deaths
Year of birth uncertain
13th-century German nobility
14th-century German nobility